Qala-e-Naw is a town in Qala e Naw District and the capital of Badghis Province, in north-west Afghanistan. Its population was estimated at 9,000 in 2006, of which 80% are Tajiks, and mostly Sunni Hazaras. Other significant communities include Pashtuns, Balochs and Uzbeks.

The city of Qala-e-naw has a population of 64,125 people (2015) with 6 Police districts (nahias) and a total land area of 3,752 Hectares. There are 7,125 total number of dwellings in Qala-e-Naw. Qala-e-naw is the provincial capital of Badghis Province.

Qala-e-Naw is a Provincial Centre located in western Afghanistan north of the Paropamisus Mountains (Selseleh-ye Safīd Kūh). Barren land accounts for 49% of the total land area and only 28% is classified as built-up. Of the built-up land, 60% is residential. District 4 has a large institutional and transportation land use as a result of the airport located there.

It has a small airport, Qala i Naw Airport.

On 7 July 2021, the Taliban began an assault on the town which culminated in defeat by Afghan forces. 69 Taliban fighters were killed, and 23 were injured. The city was captured by the Taliban on 12 August 2021, around the same time as the fall of Herat, becoming the thirteenth provincial capital to be seized as part of the wider 2021 Taliban offensive.

Climate
Qala i Naw has a cold semi-arid climate (Köppen climate classification BSk), with hot summers and cold winters. Precipitation is low, and mostly falls in winter.

References

Populated places in Badghis Province
Badghis Province
Provincial capitals in Afghanistan